The W. S. Cox Plate is an Australian Group One (G1), Weight for Age Thoroughbred horse race. The Moonee Valley Racing Club conducts the race, which is staged for three-year-olds and up.

 The race distance from 1922 to 1942 was 9½ furlongs.
 The race distance from 1943 to 1971 was 10 furlongs.
 Following Australia's adoption of the Metric system in 1972 the race distance became 2,000 metres. 
 In 1974 the distance was changed to 2,050 metres and in 1986 to today's distance of 2,040 metres.

 †  The 1946 Cox Plate was run in two divisions.

See also
 W. S. Cox Plate
 Australian horse-racing
 Melbourne Spring Racing Carnival

References

Horse races in Australia
 
Cox Plate winners